James "Jem" Rourke (1827- 24 October 1875) was a settler and trader of Irish-descent in southern Africa.  He served as a civilian in the British Army commissariat in 1846 during the Seventh Xhosa War.  In 1849 Rorke purchased a farmstead in the Colony of Natal, on the border with Zululand near a river crossing that became known as Rorke's Drift.  He established a trading post that led to good relations with the Zulu.  Rorke committed suicide in 1875.  His homestead played a key role in the 1879 Anglo-Zulu War and was the site of the Battle of Rorke's Drift.

Early life 
Rorke's father was an Irish soldier, he arrived at Mossel Bay with an Irish regiment of the British Army in 1821; there was an influx of British settlers to southern Africa in this period.  Rorke's father fought in wars against African tribesmen before settling in the Cape Colony after either his period of enlistment ended or he deserted.  James Rorke was born in 1827.

Rorke served as a civilian with the British Army commissariat (supply department) in the Seventh Xhosa War during 1846.  By the end of that year he had settled in Durban in the recently established Colony of Natal.  In 1847 he started to relocate "upcountry" towards the border with Zululand.

Rorke's Drift 

Rorke purchased a  property on the Zululand border in 1849.  His property was on the Natal bank of the Buffalo River beyond which was Zulu territory.  Rorke's land included the only drift, a shallow river crossing, for several miles up or downstream and this came to be known as Rorke's Drift.  It also lay on a hunting trail running from the border back to the settlement of Helpmekaar.  Rorke was also a hunter.

The single-storey structure was long in plan; it was constructed of locally made brick and stone with thatched roofs. His house was of an unusual layout, Rorke having an aversion to interior doors and to windows. Five of the rooms were accessible only via external doors, the remaining six rooms forming two self-contained suites. Five of the rooms had no windows at all. The front featured a covered veranda that looked out upon Rorke's vegetable garden. He named his farm Tyeana.

By the end of 1849 Rorke had become a trader as well as a farmer.  To facilitate his business he had constructed a separate store, of similar construction to his house, and a rough stone-built cattle pen.  Rorke also pioneered a road across the drift into Zululand, which became popular with hunters and traders.  Through his trading Rorke maintained good relationships with the Zulu across the border who, struggling with the name Rorke, named his post KwaJimu (meaning "[place] of Jimu").  He was a good friend of Sihayo kaXongo, the Zulu chief of the territory on the far side of the Buffalo river.  Rorke served as a cornet in the Buffalo Border Guard, a colonial militia unit and was a border agent for the Natal government.  He was married to Sra Johanna Strydom, the daughter of a local Voortrekker, and had two children, James Michael and Louisa.  James Michael Rorke became an adviser to the Zulu chieftain UHamu kaNzibe, half-brother and rival of King Cetshwayo.

Death and aftermath 

Rorke committed suicide by gunshot on 24 October 1875, apparently after a consignment of gin from Greytown was lost on the road to his farm.  It is not known if the gin was for his personal consumption or part of his trading stock.

Rorke's final wishes were to be buried near his farm under  of concrete because he knew the Zulu had a tendency to dig up European graves in search of valuable items or body parts for use in their medicine. Rorke's last will and testament was published in 1876 and among his possessions was listed "a Rifle, a Dble [double-barrelled?] gun and a revolver with cartridges"; however his wife was left destitute.

Mrs Rorke was forced to sell Rorke's homestead to a settler named John Surees.  Surtees sold it to a Swedish missionary society in 1878.  The society installed Reverend Otto Witt at the post.  Witt took over Rorke's house and converted his former store into a church.  During the Anglo-Zulu War the British Army used the house as a hospital and the church as a store; it was the site of the successful improvised defence against a superior Zulu force at the Battle of Rorke's Drift on 22/23 January 1879, during which Rorke's house burnt down.  The Rorke's Drift site is now a museum and church, Rorke's grave can be visited.

References

Bibliography 

1827 births
1875 deaths
Colony of Natal army officers